The 2008–09 Illinois State Redbirds men's basketball team represented Illinois State University during the 2008–09 NCAA Division I men's basketball season. The Redbirds, led by second year head coach Tim Jankovich, played their home games at Doug Collins Court at Redbird Arena and were a member of the Missouri Valley Conference.

The Redbirds finished the season 24–10, 11–7 in conference play to finish in third place. They were the number three seed for the Missouri Valley Conference tournament. They won their quarterfinal game versus the University of Evansville and semifinal game versus Creighton University but lost their final game versus the University of Northern Iowa.

The Redbirds received an at-large bid to the 2009 National Invitation Tournament and were assigned the number five seed in the San Diego State University regional. They were defeated by Kansas State University in the first round.

Roster

Schedule

|-
!colspan=9 style=|Exhibition Season

|-
!colspan=9 style=|Regular Season

|-
!colspan=9 style=|Missouri Valley Conference tournament

|-
!colspan=9 style=|National Invitation Tournament

References

Illinois State Redbirds men's basketball seasons
Illinois State
Illinois State